Paroled from the Big House is a 1938 American crime film directed by Elmer Clifton and starring Jean Carmen, Ted Adams and George Eldredge. It was produced as a second feature on Poverty Row. It was later reissued under the alternative title Main Street Girl.

Synopsis
A district attorney opposes the leniency of the parole board. In particular a cop killer, 'Slicker' Nixon is released from prison and immediately sets up a new racket. Pat Mallory's father is a store owner who is killed by Nixon's gang and seeks revenge by plotting to kill the gangster.

Cast
 Jean Carmen as Pat Mallory
 Ted Adams as H.S. 'Slicker' Nixon 
 George Eldredge as 'Red' Herron
 Milburn Stone as Commissioner Downey
 Walter Anthony as Joe 'Killer' Britt
 Ole Olsen as Torchy 
 Gwen Lee as Binnie Bell
 Earl Douglas as Huke 'The Dude' Curtis
 Eleanor DeVan as Rita
 Edward Kaye as 'Gunner' Garson 
 Joe Devlin as Jed Cross
 Allan Cavan as Chief of Police 
 Kit Guard as Thug

References

Bibliography
 Pitts, Michael R. Poverty Row Studios, 1929–1940. McFarland & Company, 2005.

External links
 

1938 films
1938 crime films
1930s English-language films
American crime films
Films directed by Elmer Clifton
American black-and-white films
Films with screenplays by George H. Plympton
1930s American films